The 1911–12 season was the seventh in the history of the Isthmian League, an English football competition.

Tunbridge Wells and Woking joined the league this season. London Caledonians were champions, winning their third Isthmian League title.

League table

References

Isthmian League seasons
I